

The Cvjetkovic  CA-65 Skyfly is a 1960s American homebuilt monoplane aircraft designed by Anton Cvjetkovic.

Development
Designed by Anton Cvjetkovic for home construction, the CA-65 Skyfly is a two-seat (side-by-side) wooden low-wing monoplane with a retractable tailwheel undercarriage and optional folding wings. It was first flown in 1965.

An all-metal version (CA-65A) was also designed to be home-built but does not have the folding wings.

The aircraft has an ICAO Type Designator CA65

Variants
CA-65
Wooden version for home building, available with folding wings
CA-65A
Metal version for home building with swept tail. Rotax 912S power.
CA-65W
Lycoming 108-150 HP

Specifications (CA-65 with Lycoming)

See also

References

 Cvjetkovic aircraft
 Aircraft World Directory

1960s United States sport aircraft
Homebuilt aircraft
Low-wing aircraft
Aircraft first flown in 1965
Cvjetkovic aircraft